Jenkins v. Georgia, 418 U.S. 153 (1974), was a United States Supreme Court case overturning a Georgia Supreme Court ruling regarding the depiction of sexual conduct in the film Carnal Knowledge.

The changes in the morals of American society of the 1960s and 1970s and the general receptiveness to the public to frank discussion of sexual issues was sometimes at odds with local community standards.  A theatre in Albany, Georgia showed the film. On January 13, 1972, the local police served a search warrant on the theatre, and seized the film. In March 1972, the theatre manager, Mr. Jenkins, was convicted of the crime of "distributing obscene material". His conviction was upheld by the Supreme Court of Georgia.

On June 24, 1974, the U.S. Supreme Court ruled that the State of Georgia had gone too far in classifying material as obscene in view of the Court's prior landmark decision in Miller v. California,  (the Miller standard), and overturned the conviction. The court said,

See also 
 List of United States Supreme Court cases, volume 418

External links
 

United States Supreme Court cases
United States Supreme Court cases of the Burger Court
United States obscenity case law
1974 in United States case law
Legal history of Georgia (U.S. state)